NGC 410 is an elliptical galaxy located in the constellation Pisces. It was discovered on September 12, 1784 by William Herschel. It was described by Dreyer as "pretty bright, pretty large, northeastern of 2.", the other being NGC 407.

References

External links
 

0410
17840912
Pisces (constellation)
Elliptical galaxies
004224